Makers is the 2006 release from Seattle singer-songwriter Rocky Votolato. It marks his debut on Barsuk Records after previously releasing albums on Second Nature Records. The album is characterized by sparse arrangements, focusing mainly on Votolato's voice and guitar work. Votolato's songwriting skills are on display in his most folk-sounding release to date.

Track listing
 "White Daisy Passing" – 3:07
 "Portland Is Leaving" – 2:45
 "The Night's Disguise" – 3:17
 "She Was Only in It for the Rain" – 3:09
 "Uppers Aren't Necessary" – 2:55
 "Wait Out the Days" – 2:43
 "Streetlights" – 2:29
 "Tennessee Train Tracks" – 2:25
 "Goldfield" – 3:32
 "Tinfoil Hats" – 2:39
 "Where We Left Off" – 5:38
 "Makers" – 3:18

References

External links
 Official Website
 Barsuk Records

Rocky Votolato albums
2006 albums